The colonial service Acheron-class torpedo boats were built by the Atlas Engineering Company at Sydney in 1879 for the New South Wales naval service. They were originally armed with a single spar torpedo, but this was replaced in 1887 with two 14-inch torpedoes. They were sold in 1902.

Design
The boats were designed by John I. Thornycroft & Company to mount a single spar torpedo.

Construction
In 1877 the Government of the colony of New South Wales ordered the construction of two "outrigger" torpedo boats, in response to concerns about a possible threat from foreign warships.  Tenders closed on 17 January 1878 and the winning contractor was the firm of Atlas Engineering Company at Sydney.  Both vessels were launched in early 1879 and Acheron started her trials in Sydney Harbour on 1 March 1879.

Service
Neither of the boats ever left the confines of Sydney Harbour, and they were never used in anger.  By 1885 they were in a state of disrepair and were docked at the Cockatoo Island Dockyard.  In the late 1880s they were described as "Sydney’s third line of defence", after the naval artillery and the defensive mines. Both boats were refitted again in 1896.

Fates
On 1 March 1901 Acheron and Avernus became part of the Commonwealth Naval Forces.  By this time they had become thoroughly outmoded and the Federal Government ordered their sale. In December 1902 Acheron was sold for £425 and Avernus for £502.

Acheron became Sydney's quarantine boat, renamed Jenner, and was paid off in the late 1930s. In the mid-1990s a workboat of the Royal Australian Navy detected a long thin hull with her side-scan sonar, which was thought to be the remains of Acheron.  On the other hand, after sale Avernus was abandoned on the shores of Rushcutters Bay and in the 1940s was sunk for reclamation of land at Glebe.

Newspapers from 1922 and 1923 report a different fate for Avernus. Sold in 1902 and later acquired by an illegal German immigrant residing at Darling Point Sydney, Carl von Cosel Tanzler. He winched it into a large shed and in 1915 was attempting to modify it into the likeness of a submarine. Youths caught stealing from Tanzler's shed reported at Paddington Courthouse that Tanzler was hiding a submarine, yet Tanzler stated it was simply an old torpedo boat. When he re-launched the ageing modified Avernus in Double Bay, he was arrested and spent the duration of WW1 at Trial Bay Gaol, then deported back to Europe. The modified Avernus washed aground on Double Bay beach and in 1923 it was loaded onto a barge and taken to the Datchett Street Balmain Wharf ship breakers where it was scrapped. At Balmain the wreck was viewed by an old gentleman who was one of the original builders of Avernus. The article incorrectly spells Avernus as Ibernus yet positively identifies it as either Acheron or her sister ship. An absurdly high conning tower had been fitted to Avernus prior to her abandonment. The modified wreck was described as a Jules Verne nightmare. Twenty years later the eccentric Carl Von Cosel Tanzler had migrated to America and claimed to be an ex-submarine commander.

Ships

References
Notes

Bibliography

Australia’s First Warship - The Torpedo Boat Acheron, Naval Historical Society of Australia.  Retrieved 30 October 2010.

 
Torpedo boat classes
1879 ships
Ships built in New South Wales